is an area within the city of Nanto in Toyama Prefecture, Japan. It has been inscribed on the UNESCO World Heritage List due to its traditional gasshō-zukuri houses, alongside nearby Shirakawa-gō in Gifu Prefecture. The survival of this traditional architectural style is attributed to the region's secluded location in the upper reaches of the Shōgawa river. This is also the reason that Gokayama's lifestyle and culture remained very traditional for many years after the majority of the country had modernized. Many of the houses surpass 300 years in age.

The Gokayama region includes the former villages of Taira, Kamitaira, and Toga. The gasshō hamlet of Ainokura is located in Taira, while that of Suganuma is in Kamitaira; both are nationally designated Historic Sites.

Ainokura 
, in the Gokayama region, was inscribed on the World Heritage List in December 1995 as one of the three villages of gassho-style houses.

Ainokura has 20 gassho-style houses known as minka. Most of them are 100 to 200 years old, and the oldest is said to have been built some 400 years ago. The gassho roof has a slope of about 60 degrees forming a nearly equilateral triangle. This steep pitch allows snow to slide off the roof easily. The enormous roof is supported by stout oak beams called chonabari, which are curved at the base. The roofs are rethatched every 15 to 20 years. Nowadays this is done by Gokayama Forest Owners' Cooperative.

Fumihito, Prince Akishino stayed at an Ainokura inn two times. The first time was when he was a second-year student at the Gakushūin high-school when he took part in a summer geography  training seminar. While staying in Ainkoura, he said, "I like three places in the world most, one of them is Gokayama". The second time was nine years after that with his wife.

Suganuma 
  is surrounded on three sides by the Shōgawa River. There are currently 12 houses in the village, nine of which are gassho-zukuri style houses. Two were built in the late Edo period (early to mid-19th century), six were built in the Meiji period, and the newest one was built in 1925.  During the Edo period, the economy of Gokayama was based on Japanese paper, sericulture, and the production of saltpeter, which is the raw material for gunpowder. The inhabitants of Suganuma hamlet also practiced rice cultivation using a small amount of land and slash-and-burn  agriculture.

International relations

Twin towns – Sister cities
Gokayama is twinned with:
 Alberobello, Italy

See also 
 Historic Villages of Shirakawa-gō and Gokayama
 List of Historic Sites of Japan (Toyama)
 World Heritage Sites in Japan

References

External links 

Japanese Guest Houses to stay a night in Gokayama
Travel diary and pictures of a stay in Ainokura

World Heritage Sites in Japan
Tourist attractions in Toyama Prefecture
Historic Sites of Japan
Nanto, Toyama